The Battle of Bamut was the long-lasting attempt of the Russian army to capture the village of Bamut in Western Chechnya. The fighting that took place subsequently lead to the complete destruction of the village.

Battle
In Spring 1995 during the First Chechen War, much of the significant cities and areas had been captured by the Russian army, leaving Bamut as one of the last Chechen controlled area in the lowlands. On the 10th of March 1995, fierce battles began for the village of Bamut. Several attacks on the village by the Russian army had already failed, leaving the tanks and armored vehicles to litter in the streets. The core defense of the village was made up of fighters primarily from the village and surrounding areas most notably under the command of Khizir Khachukaev.  “The approaches to the village and its main streets were mined with anti-tank and anti-personnel mines. Some of the firing points were covered with reinforced concrete.”  On April 18th, in the vicinity of Bamut, during the assault on the height of 444.4 - "Bald Mountain", a group of the Russian special forces detachment of the MVD "Rosich" was ambushed. In the battle the detachment "Rosich" suffered 27 casualties. After the fall of Nozhay-Yurt and Shatoy in the first half of June 1995, Bamut, remained the only part of the lowlands controlled by the Chechen Armed Forces. In mid-June 1995, the Chechen defenders repulsed another assault attempt. 

A pause in the hostilities was achieved in July 1995 as a result of the events in Budyonnovsk. However, in the winter of 1995-1996, military operations resumed in the area of Bamut. In February-March 1996, the Russian army again launched a large-scale offensive on Bamut, which was widely covered in the Russian media. However, it also ended in failure, as the defenders prepared an ambush on the paths of the approaching troops. On May 24 1996, the Russian army finally gained control of Bamut and the height 444.4 — "Bald Mountain". Ruslan Khaikhoroev's detachment defending Bamut broke out of the Russian encirclement, taking advantage of the twilight and the thickening fog.

In works of art
"Бамут" - a song by Musa Nasagaev.
"Бамут" - a song by Timur Mutsurayev.
"Я убит под Бамутом" - a song written by Russian soldiers of the military unit 5598 26 BON in 1996.

References

Bamut
History of Chechnya
Chechnya
First Chechen War
Bamut